Concepción Dueso Garcés (born 27 October 1967 in Huesca) is a goalball player from Spain.  She is blind and is a type B3 goalball player. She played goalball at the 2000 Summer Paralympics.  Her team was second.

References

External links 
 
 

1967 births
Living people
Paralympic goalball players of Spain
Paralympic silver medalists for Spain
Paralympic medalists in goalball
Goalball players at the 2000 Summer Paralympics
Medalists at the 2000 Summer Paralympics
People from Huesca
Sportspeople from the Province of Huesca